Rough and Ready is the third studio album by the Jeff Beck Group and the first of two by the second Jeff Beck Group. Released in 1971 by Epic Records, it featured more of a jazz, soul and R&B edge to counter Beck's lead guitar. As a songwriter, Beck contributed more pieces to Rough and Ready than he had  before, or ever would again. Beck enlisted Bobby Tench as vocalist and it is also the first time keyboardist Max Middleton is heard. Other members of this line up are drummer Cozy Powell and bassist Clive Chaman.

History
In early April and still signed to RAK, Jeff Beck reformed The Jeff Beck Group with  keyboardist Max Middleton, drummer Cozy Powell and bassist Clive Chaman and vocalist Alex Ligertwood. Later in April that year the new band began recording sessions at Island Studios in London. They worked on songs by Beck and focused on "Situation", which had lyrics by Ligertwood. Other songs such as "Morning Dew" were given attention, with the help of producer Jimmy Miller, who had worked with Traffic and with The Rolling Stones.

During May 1971, after a week of recording sessions, Beck left RAK and signed a new record deal with CBS. Epic, a subsidiary of CBS, was assigned to release Beck's work, and having heard the Island studio tapes were not happy with the vocals. During May, Beck started looking for a new vocalist. In late May, after hearing Bobby Tench perform with his band Gass, he employed him as vocalist for the band. Tench was given only a few weeks to write new lyrics and add his vocals to the album, before mixing resumed on tracks previously recorded by Beck and the other band members. During early July 1971 the band returned to Island Studios to finish the album and Beck took over as producer. Rough and Ready was released in UK on 25 October 1971 with the US release following during February 1972, a sixteen-day promotional tour in USA followed and the album eventually reached #46 in the album charts.

Critical reception

In a contemporary review for The Village Voice, music critic Robert Christgau found Tench's singing pretentious and the songs tedious: "Despite some superb textures, this is as sloppy and self-indulgent as ever." Roy Carr, writing in NME, felt that the album "falls into that trap whereby the performance far exceeds the material. Beck hasn't lost any of his fire as he rips off solo after solo with flashy confidence". On the other hand, Rolling Stone magazine's Stephen Davis said that Rough and Ready is "a surprisingly, fine piece of work from a man who wasn't really expected to come back. Beck is back, and in pretty good shape too." Derek Johnson of NME reviewed the single "Got the Feeling" positively and called it "an excellent disc combining a strong commercial element with an altogether more progressive approach".

Rough and Ready finished 23rd in the voting for the best album of 1971 in the Pazz & Jop, an annual critics poll run by The Village Voice.

Track listing

Band members
 Jeff Beck – guitars, bass guitar and production
 Bobby Tench – vocals and rhythm guitar
 Max Middleton – piano and keyboards
 Clive Chaman – bass guitar
 Cozy Powell – drums

Discography

Original release
 Epic KE-30973 1972

Reissues
 Epic EK-30973 (1990)
 Epic PET-30973 (1990)
 Epic MHCP583 (2005)
 Sony 4710472 (2006)
 Sony Japan 960 (2007)
 Epic EPC40-64619 Cassette (US)

Singles
 "Got that Feeling" / "Situation" Epic(US) 5-10814 (6 December 1971), Epic (UK) 7720 (7 January 1972)

References

Further reading

External links 
 The Jeff Beck Group - Rough and Ready (1971) album review by Stephen Thomas Erlewine, credits & releases at AllMusic
 The Jeff Beck Group - Rough and Ready (1971) album releases & credits at Discogs
 The Jeff Beck Group - Rough and Ready (1971) album credits & user reviews at ProgArchives.com
 The Jeff Beck Group - Rough and Ready (1971) album to be listened as stream on Spotify

1971 albums
Jeff Beck albums
Epic Records albums